Horrie Farmer may refer to one of two father and son Australian rules footballers:

Horrie Farmer (footballer born 1888) (1888–1934), Victorian Football League player for St Kilda
Horrie Farmer (footballer born 1909), Victorian Football League player for Richmond and North Melbourne